Olaf Klitgaard Poulsen (18 May 1914 – February 2007) was a Danish rower. He competed in the men's eight event at the 1936 Summer Olympics.

References

External links
 

1914 births
2007 deaths
Danish male rowers
Olympic rowers of Denmark
Rowers at the 1936 Summer Olympics
People from Horsens
Sportspeople from the Central Denmark Region